The Rideau Valley Conservation Authority (RVCA) is an inter-municipal environmental protection and advisory agency that works with local municipalities, government agencies, special interest groups and the general public to protect the natural resources of the Rideau River watershed. The watershed drains an area of over 4,000 square kilometres of eastern Ontario and includes towns such as Portland, Perth, Smith Falls, Merrickville, Kemptville, and Manotick. About 620,000 live in the watershed, mostly deriving from the City of Ottawa. There are 18 municipalities within the valley and most people, outside of Ottawa, draw their drinking water from the river or from groundwater.

The mission of the RVCA is to have clean drinking water, natural shorelines, and sustainable land use throughout the Rideau Valley watershed.

Rideau Valley Conservation Foundation 

The RVCA provides office space, staff, and expertise to the Rideau Valley Conservation Foundation (RVCF)  and their environmental projects, while managing all of its conservation lands. The RVCF was founded in 1970. It has an active land securement plan and strong track record in managing donated land through agreement with the RVCA. It accepts gifts of land in exchange for a charitable tax receipt for the fair market value of the property in common with groups like the Rideau Waterway Land Trust Foundation, local municipalities and the Nature Conservancy of Canada.

Conservation areas 
 Baxter
 Chapman Mills
 Foley Mountain
 Meisel Woods
 Mill Pond
 Motts Mills
 Perth Wildlife Reserve
 Portland Bay
 Richmond
 Rideau Ferry Yacht Club
 W.A. Taylor

References

External links 
 Rideau Valley Conservation Authority
 Rideau Valley Conservation Foundation
 Rideau Waterway Land Trust Foundation

Conservation authorities in Ontario

Water organizations